Otto Fog-Petersen 20 August 1914 - 10 June 2003) was a Danish journalist who served as editor-in-chief of Berlingske Aftenavis and later Weekendavisen.

Biography
Fog-Petersen was born in Nibe outside Aalborg and attended Sorø Academy. He was educated from Jydske Tidende. He joined Berlingske Media in 1937 and was appointed to editor-in-chief of Berlingske Aftenavis in 1951. He was a driving force behind the establishment of Weekendavisen when Berlingske Aftenavis was closed in 1971.

References

Berlingske people
Weekendavisen people
People from Nibe
1914 births
2003 deaths
20th-century Danish journalists